Woermann Tower also Torre Woermann is a mixed-use tower in Las Palmas on Gran Canaria, Canary Islands, Spain. Completed in 2005, the tower was designed by Abalos & Herreros in collaboration with Joaquin Casariego and Elsa Guerra, and built by Ferrovial Inmobiliaria, the company also built around the same time one of the two Torres de Santa Cruz, in the city of Santa Cruz de Tenerife. The Woermann Tower forms part of a complex which includes a public square, constructed using Portuguese stone with the artist Albert Oehlen, and a seven-storey block to the south, containing retail units and offices.

The ground floor contains a main entrance area and retail units whilst the first floor contains a library. The floors above contain apartments, usually four or five per floor. The facade is protected from the sun by solar fins running horizontally around the building, with vegetable motifs etched into the glass. Yellow colour inserts were placed in the windows in strategic locations on the facade.

See also 

 List of tallest buildings in Canary Islands

References 

Library buildings completed in 2009
Residential buildings completed in 2009
Buildings and structures in Las Palmas
Libraries in Spain
Residential skyscrapers in Spain
Companies of the Canary Islands